Seguenzia eritima is a species of sea snail, a marine gastropod mollusk in the family Seguenziidae.

Description
The height of the shell attains 4.5 mm. The sculpture is more delicate. The carinae are less acute. The riblets finer and closer. The basal lines finer and more numerous than in Seguenzia nitida. It is also narrowly umbilicated.

Distribution
This species occurs in the Atlantic Ocean off Delaware, USA, at depths between 2359 m and 3718 m

References

eritima
Gastropods described in 1884